The provincial island of Marinduque is found in between Oriental Mindoro and Quezon Province at the Southern Part of Luzon. It is part of the Region IV-B provinces, along with (Occidental and Oriental) Mindoro, Romblon, and Palawan. Similar to the majority of the Philippines, the people of Marinduque use Tagalog as its main language, with hints of dialects from the nearby Bicol and Visayan provinces as well as from the locals themselves.

Marinduque is called "The Heart of the Philippines" as the shape of the provincial island is similar to that of a human heart. Its location on the arrangement of the archipelago is also similar to the anatomy of where the heart is, in the human body.moriones festival

History and archaeological findings 
During the Spanish colonization in the late 1500s, Marinduque was part of the Batangas Province. Later on, it became part of the province of Mindoro. Marinduque only became a province of its own during the American colonization. Its first government was established in Boac, now known as the province’s capital town.

Jagor Expedition 
The pursuit for cultural discovery in Marinduque was pioneered by the German-Russian anthropologist Fedor Jagor in the 1860s when he discovered elongated skulls in one of the province’s caves. Similar skulls were also found in Cagraray and Albay. These were the very first findings of such skulls in the East, thus sparking interest in the West.

Marche Expedition 
The first systematic exploration in Marinduque was done by the French explorer, Antoine-Alfred Marche, in 1881. With the help of his allies and the locals, Marche explored the Isle of Grottos (Island of caves). During his explorations, numerous jars, dishes, figurines, golden jewelry, bones, coffins and ceramics were unearthed in several parts of the province. These findings came mostly from Boac, Islet Tres Reyes, Bathala Cave, and Gasan. Most of the artefacts are currently contained in Musée du Quai Branly and Musée de L'Homme, both located in Paris, while some are in the Smithsonian Institution in Washington, D.C.

Notable discoveries 
One of his notable discoveries would be the wooden coffins excavated from a sepulchral cave in Marinduque. These coffins had carvings of crocodile images in its lids, similar to those found in Nosy Loapasana, Madagascar.

Another would be his discovery of deformed skulls in the caves of Los Tres Reyes, Pamintaan and Macayan.  
These deformed skulls were similar to the ones discovered by Fedor Jagor in the 1860s. Such deformation in the skulls are a result of compression of the head, of a newborn child between two boards. This practice was done to make the head appear more elongated rather than round, and the forehead more flat, a feature considered as a “special mark of beauty” during the ancient times. Astoundingly, the same skull deformation was evident in those of ancient Mayan, Egyptian, and Incan people, despite not having any contact amongst each other.

Marche’s further excavations were due to his “intoxication” when he excavated the Pamintaan Cave, a cave believed to be a burial site. In here, several antiques, varying from Chinese urns, vases, gold ornaments, and such, were excavated.

A publication of Alfred Marche’s expedition in Marinduque provides evidence for the Morionistic culture of the province during the past. According to this publication, the locals before were very superstitious about places that are yet to be explored. In line with this, they tried to stop Marche to go into the caves for they feared that he would be eaten by the aswang Thus, when he came out safely during the first explorations, they believed that he had an "" (a pendant or charm) in hand that protected him from the "".

Chinese Junk Shipwreck 
In 1982, the National Museum and the Marine Archaeology Unlimited, Inc. headed an excavation of a shipwreck about | below the surface in the southwest coast of Marinduque. The site was discovered by a local fisherman who was able to retrieve many ceramic pieces even without any diving equipment in the said site. It is believed that the ship was a Chinese trading galleon from the Ming dynasty.  More than 1,100 pieces of artifacts from the site were collected, most of which are porcelain plates, jars, and stoneware[10]. The stoneware jars notably resembled the jars containing dragon designs excavated from the Pamintaan cave. Pinggan, the barangay closest to the shipwreck site, was allegedly named after the findings of the porcelain plates (pinggan- Filipino word for plate). A re-excavation was done years later in the middle of the Pinggan coast and Gaspar Island.

San Isidro Cave and Subterranean River 
A hidden cave with a subterranean river was recently discovered in Sta. Cruz, Marinduque. The San Isidro cave system contained small waterfalls gushing from the rocks, stalactites and stalagmites of varied colors and shapes, freshwater shrimps, eels, swallows, and a king cobra that guards the entrance. The cave is yet to be discovered and excavated.

Pilapil Cave 
An excavation in Pilapil Cave was made by Alfredo E. Evangelista in 1961. In this excavation, local artefacts were associated with Sung and Yuan sherds. These archaeological records provide evidence for early Chinese contact in the Philippines.

Beliefs and cultures 
The present-day Marinduqueños are very much rich in culture and artistry. Some of the traditions being performed today are already centuries old. The future of Marinduque would not have been the same without these "present-day artifacts".

Religion: Moriones Festival 
The locals from Marinduque are very religious people. This can be observed in their festivities. Marinduque is mainly known because of its Moriones Festival, a week-long Lenten event. The term "Moriones" came from the word  which means masks. The main event of the festival is the re-enactment of the story of a Roman soldier named Longinus. It is said that Longinus was a Roman soldier with a blind eye who lived during the time of Jesus Christ. When Jesus was crucified at Golgotta, Longinus was tasked to pierce the ribs of Jesus with a spear to see if He is still alive. When he did this, blood and water spurted out and some went to his eyes. This caused his blind eye to heal and be able to see. When this miracle happened, he run and told everyone about this, and saying the Jesus Christ was really the Saviour. The emperor learned of this and ordered that Longinus be captured. The chase between the Roman soldier and Longinus began. Longinus was then captured and as punishment of blasphemy, Longinus was sentenced to death by having his head cut off. This tragic story first originated in the town of Mogpog, but later on spread to the other towns.

Morionism 
Prior to the Spanish Colonization, the natives of Marinduque had paganistic beliefs. Just as in other parts of the Philippines, the belief in supernatural entities such as the anitos, aswangs, and such, was likewise prevalent in the province. However, upon the arrival of the Spaniards, Morionism then blended with their religious teachings, forming a belief that God is the creator of human beings.

Morionism centers on the principle that the soul is housed on a perishing, superficial body that must undergo physical and mental tortures in order to attain the purification and glorification of the soul.

The existence of such culture is proven by the excavated Pastores (Marinduque anitos) in the Pamintaan Cave. Moreover, the culture documented in a publication on the Marche expedition (as discussed above) better explains Morionism.

Artistry and innovation 

The Marinduqueños are very creative, resourceful and crafty. In the town of Torrijos, the people are experts in traditional weaving of Buntal fibers into mats and wall decorations. They also create wonderful earthenware from swamp clay.

The local sing and dance, offer flowers, and place crowns on the heads of the guests. Then they shower coins as a sign of blessing.

The province is also a place of delicacies, the most abundant of which are "" (delicacies made from rice).

Natural wonders 
A journey to Marinduque would not be complete without a visit to the many natural wonders of the province. Marinduque is said to be the Butterfly Capital of the Philippines. Many of the butterfly farms can be found in the town of Gasan. (Gasan was named after the shell "" which a shell found in the riverside.)

Caves are also scattered throughout the province. The Bathala Cave houses bats and pythons, as well as beautiful stalagmites and stalactites. Other caves are Duyay Cave, Talamban Cave, Tarug Cave, Talao Caves, and many more unexplored and undocumented caves.

The province also houses many falls, to name a few: Ginaras Falls, Kabugsakan Falls, and Norada Falls.

Surrounding the mainland are other islands: Tres Reyes Islands, the Polo, Maniwaya, and Mongpong Islets, Natangco Islet, Salomague Island. Some islands, like the Gaspar Island of the Tres Reyes Islands, have white sand beaches. But if the thought of traveling by boat is scary, there is still white sand beach in Torrijos called the Poctoy White Beach.

Marinduque also has an inactive volcano in it, named Mt. Malindig, and is said to be the highest peak of Marinduque. Near Mt. Malindig, natural hot springs can be found. One of these is the Malbog Hot Springs and is said to be able to cure certain diseases, in spite of its foul smell.

Sources

See also 
 http://www.biyahero.net/index.php?option=com_sobi2&sobi2Task=sobi2Details&catid=32&sobi2Id=1893&Itemid=56
 http://www.tourism.gov.ph/SitePages/InteractiveSitesPage.aspx?siteID=20
 [ “Maritime Archaeology: A Reader’s Substantive and Theoretical Contributions”] by Lawrence E. Babits and Hans Van Tilburg
 http://marinduquegov.blogspot.com/2009/07/marinduques-newest-discovery-hidden.html

History of Marinduque
Archaeology of the Philippines